Ludwig Hinterstocker (11 April 1931 – 2 July 2020) was a German former footballer who competed in the 1952 Summer Olympics.

References

1931 births
2020 deaths
People from Traunstein
Sportspeople from Upper Bavaria
German footballers
Association football forwards
Olympic footballers of Germany
Footballers at the 1952 Summer Olympics
Footballers from Bavaria
West German footballers